Adinetidae is a family of rotifers belonging to the order Bdelloidea.

Genera:
 Adineta Hudson, 1886 
 Bradyscela Bryce, 1910

References

Bdelloidea
Rotifer families